Elizabeth Hervey may refer to 

 Elizabeth Cavendish, Duchess of Devonshire (aka Lady Elizabeth Foster; née Hervey; 1758–1824) 
 Elizabeth Hervey (later Mansel; 1698–1727), daughter of Elizabeth Hervey, Countess of Bristol
 Elizabeth Hervey (writer) (née March; c. 1748 — c. 1820), British novelist
 Elizabeth Hervey, Countess of Bristol (née Felton; 1676–1741)

See also

 Elizabeth Harvey (historian), British historian
 Elizabeth Harvey (born 1946), Australian politician